Joseph B. "Joe" Vasquez (June 8, 1962 – December 16, 1995) was an American independent filmmaker.

Vasquez was born in the South Bronx, the son of two heroin addicts. His father was Puerto Rican and his mother was African-American. He began making his own films at the age of 12, and was awarded a filmmaking degree in 1983 from the City College of New York.

In 1989, he released The Bronx War, a film which he wrote, directed, and starred. In 1991, he released Hangin' with the Homeboys with New Line Cinema, the film which earned him critical acclaim. Having been arrested for running naked through an apartment building, he was later diagnosed as manic-depressive.

On December 16, 1995, Vasquez died as a result of AIDS-related complications in Chula Vista, California, aged 33.

One of his stories was posthumously used as a segment in the 1997 film Riot.

Filmography

Film

References

External links
 Joseph Vasquez filmography via New York Times
Joseph B. Vásquez @ thetvdb.com
 

1962 births
1995 deaths
African-American film directors
People from the Bronx
People with bipolar disorder
American people of Puerto Rican descent
AIDS-related deaths in California
Film directors from New York City
20th-century African-American people